Saathire (2004) is an Odia language film also dubbed in Bengali, based on Leena Gangopadhaya's story Janmadin. It was released in 2004. Directed by Hara Patnaik, the movie featured Anubhav Mohanty, Madhumita Basu, Pintu Nanda and Anita Das. The film was a box office success.

Cast 
Anubhav Mohanty
Madhumita Basu
 Pintu Nanda 
Anita Das

Production 
Madhumita Basu from Kolkata made her debut with this film.

References

2000s Odia-language films
2008 films